Matthew Spies (born 18 August 1961) is an Australian modern pentathlete. He competed at the 1984 Summer Olympics.

References

External links
 

1961 births
Living people
Australian male modern pentathletes
Olympic modern pentathletes of Australia
Modern pentathletes at the 1984 Summer Olympics